The 41st New York State Legislature, consisting of the New York State Senate and the New York State Assembly, met from January 27 to April 21, 1818, during the first year of DeWitt Clinton's governorship, in Albany.

Background
Under the provisions of the New York Constitution of 1777, amended by the Constitutional Convention of 1801, 32 Senators were elected on general tickets in the four senatorial districts for four-year terms. They were divided into four classes, and every year eight Senate seats came up for election. Assemblymen were elected countywide on general tickets to a one-year term, the whole Assembly being renewed annually.

In 1797, Albany was declared the State capital, and all subsequent Legislatures have been meeting there ever since. In 1799, the Legislature enacted that future Legislatures meet on the last Tuesday of January of each year unless called earlier by the governor.

On February 24, 1817, Gov. Tompkins resigned, to take office as U.S. Vice President on March 4; and Lt. Gov. John Tayler became Acting Governor for the remainder of the legislative year, until June 30. On March 25, the Democratic-Republican State Convention nominated Canal Commissioner DeWitt Clinton for Governor, and Acting Gov. John Tayler for Lieutenant Governor. Clinton received 85 votes against 41 for Peter B. Porter (Buckt.). The Federalist Party did not nominate candidates for governor and lieutenant governor.

On April 6, 1817, State Senator Chauncey Loomis died, leaving a vacancy in the Western District.

On April 7, 1817, Tompkins County was created from parts of Cayuga and Seneca counties, and was apportioned two seats in the Assembly, one each taken from Cayuga and Seneca.

At this time the politicians were divided into two opposing political parties: the Federalists and the Democratic-Republicans. The Democratic-Republican Party was split into two factions: the Clintonians (supporters of Gov. DeWitt Clinton and his Erie Canal project) and the Bucktails (led by Att. Gen. Martin Van Buren, and including the Tammany Hall organization in New York City).

Elections
The State election was held from April 29 to May 1, 1817. DeWitt Clinton and John Tayler were elected unopposed.

Senator Jonathan Dayton (Southern D.) was re-elected. Stephen Barnum (Southern D.), Jabez D. Hammond, John Lounsbery (both Middle D.), Roger Skinner, Henry Yates Jr., Samuel Young (all three Eastern D.) and Assemblyman Isaac Wilson (Western D.) were also elected to full terms in the Senate. Assemblyman Jediah Prendergast (Western D.) was elected to fill the vacancy. All nine were Democratic-Republicans.

Sessions
The Legislature met at the Old State Capitol in Albany on January 27, 1818, and adjourned on April 21.

David Woods (Dem.-Rep.) was re-elected Speaker with 97 votes.

Assemblyman Ogden Edwards (Buckt.) proposed a bill to call a State convention to amend the Constitution concerning the appointment of public officers, his object being the abolition of the Council of Appointment. The bill, opposed by Gov. DeWitt Clinton, was eventually rejected, but the issue was pursued further by the Bucktails, and led to the New York State Constitutional Convention of 1821, and a new Constitution.

On April 21, 1818, the Legislature enacted that future Legislatures meet on the first Tuesday of January of each year, unless called earlier by the governor.

State Senate

Districts
 The Southern District (6 seats) consisted of Dutchess, Kings, New York, Putnam, Queens, Richmond, Rockland, Suffolk and Westchester counties.
 The Middle District (9 seats) consisted of Albany, Chenango, Columbia, Delaware, Greene, Orange, Otsego, Schoharie, Sullivan and Ulster counties.
 The Eastern District (8 seats) consisted of Clinton, Essex, Franklin, Herkimer, Jefferson, Lewis, Montgomery, Rensselaer,  St. Lawrence, Saratoga, Schenectady, Warren and Washington counties.
 The Western District (9 seats) consisted of Allegany, Broome, Cattaraugus, Cayuga, Chautauqua, Cortland, Genesee, Madison,  Niagara, Oneida, Onondaga, Ontario, Seneca, Steuben, Tioga and Tompkins counties.

Note: There are now 62 counties in the State of New York. The counties which are not mentioned in this list had not yet been established, or sufficiently organized, the area being included in one or more of the abovementioned counties.

Members
The asterisk (*) denotes members of the previous Legislature who continued in office as members of this Legislature. Jediah Prendergast and Isaac Wilson changed from the Assembly to the Senate.

Employees
 Clerk: John F. Bacon

State Assembly

Districts

 Albany County (4 seats)
 Allegany and Steuben counties (2 seats)
 Broome County (1 seat)
 Cattaraugus, Chautauqua and Niagara counties (2 seats)
 Cayuga County (3 seats)
 Chenango County (3 seats)
 Clinton and Franklin counties (1 seat)
 Columbia County (4 seats)
 Cortland County (1 seat)
 Delaware County (2 seats)
 Dutchess County (5 seats)
 Essex County (1 seat)
 Genesee County (3 seats)
 Greene County (2 seats)
 Herkimer County (3 seats)
 Jefferson County (2 seats)
 Kings County (1 seat)
 Lewis County (1 seat)
 Madison County (3 seats)
 Montgomery County (5 seats)
 The City and County of New York (11 seats)
 Oneida County (5 seats)
 Onondaga County (4 seats)
 Ontario County (7 seats)
 Orange County (4 seats)
 Otsego County (5 seats)
 Putnam County (1 seat)
 Queens County (3 seats)
 Rensselaer County (5 seats)
 Richmond County (1 seat)
 Rockland County (1 seat)
 St. Lawrence County (1 seat)
 Saratoga County (4 seats)
 Schenectady County (2 seats)
 Schoharie County (3 seats)
 Seneca County (2 seats)
 Suffolk County (3 seats)
 Sullivan and Ulster counties (4 seats)
 Tioga County (1 seat)
 Tompkins County (2 seats)
 Warren and Washington counties (5 seats)
 Westchester County (3 seats)

Note: There are now 62 counties in the State of New York. The counties which are not mentioned in this list had not yet been established, or sufficiently organized, the area being included in one or more of the abovementioned counties.

Assemblymen
The asterisk (*) denotes members of the previous Legislature who continued as members of this Legislature.

Employees
 Clerk: Aaron Clark
 Sergeant-at-Arms: Caleb Benjamin
 Doorkeeper: Benjamin Whipple

Notes

Sources
 The New York Civil List compiled by Franklin Benjamin Hough (Weed, Parsons and Co., 1858) [see pg. 108f for Senate districts; pg. 123 for senators; pg. 148f for Assembly districts; pg. 193f for assemblymen]
 The History of Political Parties in the State of New-York, from the Ratification of the Federal Constitution to 1840 by Jabez D. Hammond (4th ed., Vol. 1, H. & E. Phinney, Cooperstown, 1846; pages 443–469)
 Election result Assembly, Albany Co. at project "A New Nation Votes", compiled by Phil Lampi, hosted by Tufts University Digital Library
 Election result Assembly, Cattaraugus, Chautauqua and Niagara Co. at project "A New Nation Votes"
 Partial election result Assembly, Clinton and Franklin Co. at project "A New Nation Votes" [gives only partial vote of Clinton Co.]
 Election result Assembly, Dutchess Co. at project "A New Nation Votes"
 Election result Assembly, Genesee Co. at project "A New Nation Votes"
 Partial election result Assembly, Greene Co. at project "A New Nation Votes" [gives no candidates' names]
 Election result Assembly, Jefferson Co. at project "A New Nation Votes"
 Election result Assembly, Montgomery Co. at project "A New Nation Votes"
 Election result Assembly, Onondaga Co. at project "A New Nation Votes"
 Election result Assembly, Rensselaer Co. at project "A New Nation Votes"
 Election result Assembly, Schenectady Co. at project "A New Nation Votes"
 Election result Assembly, Schoharie Co. at project "A New Nation Votes"
 Election result Assembly, Tompkins Co. transcribed from Landmarks of Tompkins County, NY by John H. Selkreg (1894; Ch. VI)
 Partial election result Senate, Middle D. at project "A New Nation Votes" [gives only votes from Albany, Clinton and Greene Co.]
 Partial election result Senate, Eastern D. at project "A New Nation Votes" [gives only votes from Jefferson, Montgomery, Rensselaer and Schenectady Co.]
 Partial election result Senate, Western D. at project "A New Nation Votes" [gives only votes of Chautauqua and Genesee Co.]
 Election result Assembly Speaker at project "A New Nation Votes"
 Election result Council of Appointment at project "A New Nation Votes"

041
1817 in New York (state)
1818 in New York (state)
1817 U.S. legislative sessions